Sathuranga Vettai is a 2014 Indian Tamil-language heist film written and directed by debutant H. Vinoth, starring Natraj and Ishaara Nair in the lead roles, while Ponvannan, Ilavarasu, and Piraisoodan, among others, play supporting roles. Produced by Manobala, it features music by Sean Roldan and cinematography by K. G. Venkatesh. The film, touted to be an "indianized con movie", was released by Thiruppathi Brothers Film Media on 18 July 2014 and received positive reviews from critics. It has been remade in Telugu as Bluff Master and is being remade in Kannada as Jagath Khiladi. A sequel titled Sathuranga Vettai 2 starring Arvind Swamy and Trisha began production in October 2016 and wrapped in March 2017, but has not released as of 2023.

Plot 
Gandhi Babu is a skilled con artist, who dreams of doing ingenious scams and executes them perfectly. His scams include selling ignorant people ordinary snakes, claiming that they are exotic and will fetch crores in the international market, promoting a nonexistent multilevel marketing company with its controversial chain referral schemes promising a BMW car within a year. His scams include duping people through impersonation – posing close to/claiming relationship with influential people, the convincing people of things such as Lilliput, exotic stones, and artifacts, last but not least the infamous Emu scam, where the investors were offered exorbitant returns through Emu farms. Bhanu is from a poor family, who comes to work for Gandhi and falls for his charms. Despite having a soft corner for her, Gandhi has money as his first priority. Because of this, he abandons Bhanu. Gandhi is arrested in a minor scam but the local police didn't realise his real identity. As the newspaper publishes this scam as a small box news of low importance, ACP Jaya Prakasham of Chennai Police identifies Gandhi and informs the local police and multiple cases are filed against him. 

The cops subject him to torture and try to recover the money, but in vain.  As the court releases him months later due to absence of solid evidence, his associates betray Gandhi and escape with the remaining money. An angered investor hires Valavan and his gang to recover his money and kill Gandhi Babu, The gang nabs him outside the court and is beaten to a pulp. Later he convinces them of making another con of worth a billion and pay them more than their hirer. Believing his abilities they kill and dispose their hirer and pull another scam to fuel a bigger one.  He believes that if a person is foolish or greedy enough to be duped, then the person is to be blamed. He argues that every election voters are conned by the candidates who promise them the moon, but never come through. The next scam was nothing but a trap laid for gang by Gandhi Babu, he sends the gang to a his old scam's victim Chettiyar, knowing that they'll get caught as he's alert and will call the police due to his past experience. The gang gets arrested and angered by Gandhi Babu's betrayal. Meanwhile he moves back to Bhanu and she looks after him and they get married. 

Later, Bhanu becomes pregnant. As the gang gets released they give Gandhi Babu a choice whether to pull a bigger scam and compensate their losses, or he and his wife get killed by them. Babu agrees to help them, The gang leaves Dravidan to keep an eye on pregnant Bhanu and leaves to Madurai to perform a final heist to hand over the money to them. They target Moovendhar, a rich and politically well-connected marble and granite businessman, they target him through the rice pulling scam, one of the high-profile scams during the times. They offer the artifact involved in the scam as a solution to his problems. As Moovendar agrees to the deal, the artifact is transferred after rituals and the gang receives  as payment. The passage of money results in a tussle. Gandhi kills them and returns to his wife and child with the money. Finally, the look on her face makes him realize the value of life, and he leaves the money to the police custody.

Cast 

 Natty as Gandhi Babu, a skilled conman
 Ishaara Nair as Bhanu
 Ponvannan as ACP Jeya Prakasham IPS
 Ilavarasu as Chettiyar
 Piraisoodan as Judge
 Ramachandran Durairaj as Thilagan
 Madhusudhan Rao as Cheta
 K. S. G. Venkatesh as Moovendhar, an influential businessman
 Valavan as Valavan
 Dharani Vasudevan as Guru
 Senthi as Valli
 Vani Shree Shetty as Snake Doctor
 Flower A. Manoharan
 Divya Krishnan as NGO akka (sister)

Production 
Director Vinoth said that he was turned down by several producers before he met director Nalan Kumarasamy who he handed over his film's script. While Nalan was on a trip, his mother found the script, read and loved it and asked Nalan to read it too, who too liked it and came forward to help him find a producer. Actor Manobala, who had wanted to start a new production house and had asked Nalan to find some good stories, read the script by Vinoth and instantly agreed to produce it.

The film was said to be a "con film". Vinoth stated, "My film is about the pace at which we all want to make money in our lives. It's about the anger of common man who thinks money is the solution to all his problems. When there's imbalance in nature, we experience tsunami and earthquake. Likewise, my story is about the imbalance in the social morals of a common man". Although it was a heist film, the director said that he had made the film "as funny as possible" and that it had been narrated with "a lot of fun, satire and dark humour". It was reported that the film's screenplay was written in "a six-episode format".

Soundtrack 

The film's soundtrack was composed by Sean Roldan. The album features five tracks and was released on 27 April 2014. Many colleagues of Manobala were present at the launch.

The Times of India gave the soundtrack a rating of 3 stars and wrote, "the composer doesn't disappoint in his second outing. This five-track album has a fair mix of every genre...with a touch of Sean's guitar techniques that you cannot miss out". Indiaglitz.com wrote that Sathuranga Vettai was "Sean's supreme sophomore effort" and that he "is definitely here to stay for a long time".

Release 
The film's rights were bought by Thiruppathi Brothers Film Media in June 2014. The satellite rights of the film were sold to STAR Vijay. Prior to the release, Manobala had held several sneak previews of the film for personalities from the film industry, who were impressed with the film. Thereafter, Thirrupathi Brothers were trying to release the film in over 200 screens in Tamil Nadu.

Critical reception 
The Times of India gave it 3.5 stars out of 5 and wrote, "Sathuranka Vettai shows what good writing can do to a film. The film is an expertly woven tale of a remorseless con man, for whom, "money is the ultimate"...The real hero of Sathuranka Vettai is its script, which, with its twists and turns, keeps us guessing for most parts of the film". Sify wrote, "With terrific screenplay, racy narration and out-of-the-box presentation, Sathuranga Vettai is a surprisingly fresh film that works big time. The film rests on intelligent writing peppered with smart dialogues and the fresh appeal of its lead actors. H Vinoth is definitely one of the great new finds of Tamil cinema and scores for his near perfect script, narration and packaging. Here is superior quality cinema perfect for a night out at the movies". The New Indian Express wrote, "With an intelligently-crafted screenplay, deft treatment, racy pace and some meaningful lines, director Vinoth establishes his credentials as a writer-director in Sathuranga Vettai, his very first effort. Weaving a tale centered around a conman, he infuses in it a judicious blend of humour, sentiment, intrigue and suspense, keeping one’s attention glued to the screen". Silverscreen.in wrote, "It’s a con movie of the highest order. It could also be a book. There’s intrigue, there’s laughter, there’s conspiracy, and more laughter. One moment, there’s feverish excitement, and the next, we slap our forehead in exasperation. It also makes us whistle. It’s that cool". IANS gave it 3 stars out of 5 and wrote, "The reason newcomer Vinoth's Sathuranga Vettai is an almost flawless film in the genre is because it succeeds in managing to con the audiences as well, more than once. It's not a film about people who con but one about those who get conned, why they get conned and how they get conned".

Baradwaj Rangan gave a more mixed review, writing, "Vinoth employs a series of tricks to amp up his narrative, to make us feel we’re watching a really cool movie...What we don’t get is the pleasure of being conned. We don’t see too many of these films in Tamil, so the newness keeps us watching (this is one of those not-bad-for-a-first-film films) — but the cons aren’t shaped well. They seem too easy (except for the last one) and the victims seem too dumb".

Accolades 
 Vikatan Award for Best Film
 Second Best Feature Film at Chennai International Film Festival

Sequel
In early 2015, Vinoth agreed to make his next film for the production studio, Thirrupathi Brothers, who had helped distribute the earlier film. Vinoth submitted two scripts to them, including a sequel to his earlier film. Soon after, Thirrupathi Brothers ran into financial difficulties and Vinoth went on to narrate the script of the sequel, to actors Ajith Kumar and Suriya, and potentially be produced by Sathya Jyothi Films and Studio Green, but neither venture materialised.

In August 2016, the original film's producer, Manobala, came forward and decided to produce the film himself, bringing in Arvind Swamy and Trisha, to play the lead roles. Vinoth parted with his script, because he was busy working on the pre-production of another film starring Karthi, so N. V. Nirmal Kumar, who had previously made Salim (2014), was signed on as director. The film subsequently began production in mid-October 2016. Arvind Swamy finished shooting his portions in March 2017, while Trisha finished hers the following month. Few portions of the film were shot at Penang. In June 2017, the crew has completed the filming and it is a complete wrap. However, for over five years the film remained in post-production hell due to Arvind Swamy refusing to dub for his character amidst Manobala's financial troubles.

Sathuranga Vettai 2 was scheduled to release on 7 October 2022, but was postponed indefinitely, reportedly due to the success of Ponniyin Selvan: I resulting in non-availability of screens.

References

External links 
 

2010s heist films
2010s Tamil-language films
2014 black comedy films
2014 directorial debut films
2014 films
Films about con artists
Films scored by Sean Roldan
Indian black comedy films
Indian heist films
Tamil films remade in other languages
Films directed by H. Vinoth